Alfred Szego (April 9, 1914 – September 1, 1991) was a numismatic historian, who specialized in 14th-17th-century Italian coinage, coinage of ancient Rome, Greece, Carthage, Judea, Spain, medieval Austria, and 19th-century Europe.

Born in New York to Oscar and Rose Szego, Jewish immigrants who emigrated from Budapest in 1912. Oldest of four children.  Married Augusta, June 1940. Two children, Phillip and Carol.

Szego originally became interested in numismatics in 1955, while he was a television repairman.  One of his customers was planning to sell a cache of old coins to a local dealer to raise cash for his repair bill; Szego, however, accepted the coins towards payment at a price better than offered by the coin dealer.  After this, he and his wife began to learn more about numismatics. Together, they created a thriving specialty business, concentrating on coinage of Ancient Rome, the Holy Roman Empire, and Medieval Austria.  Szego was working on a book on Medieval coinage at the time of his death.

In 1969, Szego and his wife, Augusta, were involved in a deadly two car crash in which neither were hurt, but a third passenger was killed; the driver of the other vehicle was arrested.

Szego was also a dedicated amateur botanist who invested his energies into performing cross breeding experiments on American Chestnut in conjunction with the Northern Nut Growers Association, seeking a chestnut-blight resistant subspecies. Due to the slow growing nature of the American Chestnut, his work set the stage for others, who are now further breeding with some success.

Publications (Works, Bibliography) 

 
 Primarily a derivative work, included primary study of previously unattributed coinage that was issued during the period as well as previously untranslated material.
 Szego A (1948) Breeding chestnuts in the New York city area. Annual Report of the Northern Nut Growers Association 39:196-199
 Szego A  (1953) Growing American chestnuts and their hybrids under blight conditions.  Ann. Rept. No. Nut Growers Assoc. 44:154-156.
 Szego A  (1964) Experiences with hybrid chestnuts under seashore conditions. 55:29-30.
 Szego A  (1968) New chestnuts for the northeastern states.  Ann. Rept. No. Nut Growers Assoc. 59:87-92.
 Szego A  (1969) New and little known facts about chestnuts.  60:27-30
 Szego A  (1970) Experiences with various chestnut species and their hybrids on eastern Long Island.  61:77-81.
 Szego A (1980) Hypovirulence and chestnut breeding. 71:33-35.

References 

1991 deaths
1914 births
20th-century American historians
American male non-fiction writers
20th-century American male writers